Women in Distress (WID) is a nationally accredited, state-certified, full service domestic violence center in Broward County, Florida. WID adopts an empowerment based model. WID provides victims of domestic violence with safe shelter, crisis intervention and resources, and raises community awareness through intervention, education and advocacy. WID works in partnership with the Broward County Sheriff's Office (BSO). At a press conference in October 2009, Florida Governor Charlie Crist commended Women in Distress and Broward Sheriff's Office for their joint efforts to combat domestic violence. Tiffany Carr, the CEO of Florida Coalition Against Domestic Violence (FCADV) said Broward County had been chosen to lead the rollout of Florida's new $1.2 million program to combat child abuse, because the successful partnership between Women in Distress and Broward Sheriff's Office had rapidly exceeded all expectations.

In 2018–2019, WID received 7,966 calls on their 24-hour crisis line.

History and Services

Women in Distress was established in 1972 as a nonprofit agency helping women in crisis, by feminist and women's rights activist Roxcy Bolton.

In 1974, Women in Distress of Broward County, Inc. was co-founded by Edee Greene. WiD's first refuge for homeless women was a donated four bedroom home. Eventually they opened their first crisis shelter, housing 12 homeless women. Following the murder of a client who had returned to her violent spouse to rejoin her children, further donations enabled the purchase of a 54-bed shelter, accommodating children of domestic violence victims and homeless women. In November 1995, the Jim and Jan Moran Family Center opened. In 1999 a $1 million endowment allowed WID to open a second 8-bed shelter in Hollywood. 

In 2008, WID expanded with the purchase of a 6-acre campus in Deerfield Beach. The campus included a new Jim & Jan Moran Family Center, with 62 beds and has expanded to 135 beds. Services at the center include crisis intake, individual and group counseling, parenting classes, and respite child care. There is also a sub-station of the Broward Sheriff's Office on the site.

Community

To coincide with the county's growing diverse populations, WID has expanded its target communities to include Spanish, Creole, African, Middle Eastern, Russian, and Eastern European communities. Language services are provided by staff in English, Spanish, Creole and Portuguese. WID supports same-sex domestic violence victims through the EAGLE (Ending Abuse of Gays and Lesbians Everywhere…even at home) program.

In 2007, WID received an AmeriCorps grant. Twenty AmeriCorps members now work full-time in community education, each with a special focus area. These include schools, the Latin, Haitian, African American and Caribbean communities, legal professionals, civic groups, corporations, media, faith based organizations, health/fitness, and beauty salons.

Financial effects on Women in Distress

The 41 domestic violence centers in Florida have seen a 25 to 30 percent increase in their demand for services since 2009. This is due to an increase both in incidents of domestic violence, and in the lethality of these incidents. In July 2011, Mary Riedel, the president and CEO of WID, stated that the steep increase in frequency and lethality of domestic violence is probably due to the impact of the economic downturn and the recession on families. Despite the increasing demands for its services, in August 2011, WID received news of an $8000 funding cut which will impact WID's phone hotline and counseling services.

References

Women's shelters in the United States
Non-profit organizations based in Florida
1974 establishments in Florida
Women in Florida